TU Me is a freeware instant messaging and Voice over IP app developed by Telefónica Digital. It allows users to send instant messages, make free phone calls to contacts, share photos, record and send audio messages, and share their location. TU Me works on 3G and WiFi networks.

History 
TU Me was the first product launched under Telefónica Digital’s "TU" brand, which focuses on innovation in the digital communications space. Launched for iPhone on May 9, 2012, it was the first consumer-facing product from Telefónica Digital and the first time Telefónica Digital had launched a product worldwide, regardless of its operating markets. The app was initially limited to Apple's iPhone. TU Me launched on Google’s Android operating system on June 19, 2012.

It was discontinued on August 8, 2013.

Features and functionality 
TU Me allows users to communicate via instant messaging, make phone calls (over 3G or Wi-Fi), take and share photos, record and send audio messages, and share their current location. Interactions are stored in a timeline format, giving users the ability to scroll through and keep a history of conversations. In the latest version of TU Me, support was added for Dropbox, allowing users to transfer files to their TU Me contacts directly through the application.

Registration and security 
After download, TU Me requires account registration and verification via a four digit authentication code sent automatically to the user in the form of a text message.
All message transmission is encrypted and the images are served by https with authentication. Users are authorized using session tokens. 
TU Me has a facility to check the phone numbers stored in a user’s address book, sending them to the network and storing them remotely so users do not need to add contacts in a separate address book.

Languages 
TU Me is available in English, Spanish (Castilian and Latin American), German, Portuguese (Portuguese and Brazilian Portuguese), Traditional Chinese and Simplified Chinese and Russian.

References

Mobile software